There are approximately 1,107  species of arachnid native to Ireland. Not up to date for all taxa. Arachnids are eight-legged chelicerate arthropods with pedipalps and bodies divided into two tagmata.

The most best known and familiar group in Ireland is the spiders, and there are also several species of harvestman (daddy-long-legs), ticks, mites and pseudoscorpions. Arachnid groups absent from Ireland include true scorpions, whip scorpions, solifuges, cave spiders, microwhip scorpions, hooded tick spiders and tarantulas.

Subclass Dromopoda

Order Opiliones (harvestmen / daddy-long-legs)
15 native species and three species which are not considered to be native: Odiella spinosus, Opilio parietinus (Phalangiidae) and Dicranopalpus ramosus (Leiobunidae)

Family Nemastomatidae

Mitostoma chrysomelas
Nemastoma lugubre bimaculatum

Family Phalangiidae

Dicranopalpus ramosus
Lacinius ephippiatus
Megabunus diadema
Mitopus morio
Oligolophus hanseni
Oligolophus tridens 
Opilio parietinus
Opilio saxatilis
Paroligolophus agrestis
Phalangium opilio
Rilaena triangularis (Paraplatybunus triangularis)

Family Sclerosomatidae

Leiobunum blackwalli
Leiobunum rotundum
Nelima gothica

Family Trogulidae

Anelasmocephalus cambridgei

Order Pseudoscorpionida (false scorpions)
17 species

Family Cheiridiidae

Cheiridium museorum

Family Cheliferidae

House pseudoscorpion (Chelifer cancroides)

Family Chernetidae

Allochernes powelli
Dinocheirus panzeri
Lamprochernes nodosus
Lamprochernes savignyi
Pselaphochernes dubius 
Pselaphochernes scorpioides

Family Chthonidae
Kewochthonius halberti

Family Chthoniidae

Chthonius ischnochele
Chthonius orthodactylus 
Chthonius tetrachelatus

Family Neobisiidae
Neobisium carcinoides
Neobisium carpenteri 
Neobisium maritimum
Roncocreagris cambridgei
Roncus lubricus

Subclass Acari (ticks and mites)
At least 684 species

Order Ixodida (ticks)

Family Ixodidae
10 species
Dermacentor reticulatus
Castor bean tick (Ixodes ricinus)

Family Argasidae (soft ticks) 
2 species

Order Prostigmata (sucking true mites)
249 species

Family Alycidae    
4 species

Family Arrenuridae     
5 species

Family Bdellidae     
5 species

Family Ereynetidae    
1 species

Family Eriophyidae (gall mites)
52 species 

Aceria cephalonea
Sycamore felt gall mite (Aceria pseudoplatani)
Eriophyes exilis
Eriophyes laevis  
Eriophyes macrorhynchus  subsp. aceribus
Eriophyes prunispinosae  
Eriophyes pyri
Eriophyes similis
Phyllocoptes goniothorax
Phyllocoptes malinus
Big bud gall mite (Phytoptus avellanae)

Family Erythraeidae     
7 species

Family Eupodidae    
2 species

Family Eylaidae     
3 species

Family Halacaridae (marine mites)
44 species
Thalassarachna capuzina

Family Hydrodromidae 
1 species
Yellow foot mite (Hydrodroma despiciens)

Hydrachnidiae
2 species

Family Hydryphantidae    
2 species

Family Hygrobatidae    
6 species

Family Lebertiidae    
11  species

Family Limnesiidae    
2 species

Family Meyerellidae    
3 species

Family Microtrombidiidae    
4 species

Family Mideidae    
1 species

Family Mideopsidae    
1 species

Family Nanorchestidae    
2 species

Family Oxidae    
1 species

Family Penthaleidae    
2 species

Family Phytoptidae    
2 species

Family Pionidae     
14 species

Family Podothrombiidae    
1 species

Family Rhagidiidae    
4 species

Family Scutacaridae    
1 species

Family Sperchontidae    
7  species

Family Stigmaeidae    
3 species

Family Tanaupodidae    
1 species

Family Tarsonemidae    
14 species

Family Tetranychidae    
6 species

Family Teutoniidae    
1 species

Family Torrenticolidae    
9 species

Family Trombiculidae    
1 species

Family Tydeidae    
15 species

Family Unionicolidae    
6 species

Order Sarcoptiformes (Clade)

Suborder Oribatida (moss mites / beetle mites)

173 species have been identified for the Republic of Ireland

Family Achipteriidae
4 species

Family Adelphacaridae
1 species

Family Ameronothridae
7 species

Family Banksinomidae
1 species

Family Belbidae 
1 species

Family Brachychthoniidae 
19 species

Family Caleremaeidae 
1 species

Family Camisiidae
6 species

Family Cepheidae 
3 species

Family Cosmochthoniidae 
1 species

Family Euphthiracaridae 
1species

Family Euzetidae
2 species

Family Hermanniidae  
7 species

Family Hypochthoniidae 
2 species

Family Liodidae  
1 species

Family Malaconothridae   
6 species

Family Mycobatidae   
4 species

Family Nanhermanniidae   
4 species

Family Nothridae     
2 species

Family Perlohmanniidae    
1 species

Family Phthiracaridae
4 species
Phthiracarus affinis

Suborder Brachypylina

Family Carabodidae 
5 species

Family Ceratozetidae  
12 species

Family Chamobatidae 
4 species

Family Ctenobelbidae 
1 species

Family Cymbaeremaeidae 
1 species

Family Damaeidae
3 species
Belba corynopus

Family Eremaeidae 
1 species

Family Galumnidae 
2 species

Family Haplozetidae 
1 species

Family Humerobatidae 
1 species

Family Hydrozetidae 
1  species

Family Liacaridae  
4 species

Family Limnozetidae  
2 species

Family Metrioppiidae  
1 species

Family Micreremidae   
1 species

Family Neoliodidae    
1 species

Family Oppiidae      
16 species

Family Oribatellidae   
3 species

Family Oribatulidae    
7 species

Family Passalozetidae       
1 species

Family Phenopelopidae    
8 species

Family Protoribatidae    
1 species

Family Protoribatidae    
1 species

Family Punctoribatidae     
1 species

Family Quadroppiidae    
1 species

Family Scheloribatidae 
2 species

Family Scutoverticidae
2 species

Family Steganacaridae 
2 species

Family Suctobelbidae
6  species

Family Tectocepheidae
1 species

Family Thyrisomidae 
2 species

Family Xenillidae 
1 species

Suborder Astigmatina

Order Trombidiformes

Family Limnocharidae

Limnochares aquatica

Family Tarsonemidae (thread-footed mites / white mites)

Some species

Family Trombidiidae (red velvet mites)
Trombidium holosericeum

Order Araneae (spiders)
390 species belonging to 31 families

Family Agelenidae (funnel-web spiders) 

Agelena labyrinthica
Cryphoeca silvicola (C.L. Koch, 1834)
Eratigena agrestis 	
Giant house spider (Eratigena atrica)
Malthonica pagana C.L. Koch, 1841	
Tegenaria domestica 
Tegenaria parietina 
Tegenaria silvestris  
Textrix denticulata (Olivier, 1789)

Family Amaurobiidae (tangled nest spiders)

Amaurobius fenestralis (Lace-webbed spider)
Amaurobius ferox (black lace-weaver)
Amaurobius similis (Lace-webbed spider)

Family Anyphaenidae
Anyphaena accentuata (Walckenaer, 1802)

Family Araneidae (typical orb-weavers)

Agalenatea redii
European garden spider (Araneus diadematus)
Four-spot orbweaver (Araneus quadratus)
Araneus sturmi
Araneus triguttatus
Cucumber green spider (Araniella cucurbitina)
Araniella opisthographa (Kulczynski, 1905)
Araniella displicata (Hentz, 1847)
Atea triguttata (Fabricius, 1775)
Cyclosa conica
Gibbaranea gibbosa
Hypsosinga albovittata
Hypsosinga pygmaea
Furrow orb spider (Larinioides cornutus)
Larinioides patagiatus (Clerck, 1757)	
Larinioides sclopetarius (Clerck, 1757)
Mangora acalypha (Walckenaer, 1802)	
Walnut orb-weaver spider (Nuctenea umbratica)
Zygiella atrica
Silver-sided sector spider (Zygiella x-notata)

Family Atypidae (purseweb spiders)
Atypus affinis

Family Cheiracanthiidae
Cheiracanthium erraticum  (Walckenaer, 1802)
Cheiracanthium virescens (Sundevall, 1833)

Family Clubionidae (sac spiders)
Clubiona brevipes  
Clubiona comta
Clubiona diversa
Clubiona juvenis Simon, 1878 
Clubiona lutescens
Clubiona neglecta
Clubiona pallidula
Clubiona phragmitis   
Clubiona reclusa
Clubiona stagnatilis  
Clubiona subtilis  
Clubiona terrestris 
Clubiona trivialis

Family Cybaeidae

Diving bell spider (Argyroneta aquatica)

Family Dictynidae

Argenna subnigra (O.P.-Cambridge, 1861)
Dictyna arundinacea
Dictyna latens 
Dictyna uncinata Thorell, 1856	
Nigma puella

Family Dysderidae (woodlouse hunters)

Woodlouse spider (Dysdera crocata)
Dysdera erythrina
Harpactea hombergi (Scopoli, 1763)

Family Gnaphosidae (flat-bellied ground spiders)

Drassodes cupreus
Drassodes lapidosus (Walckenaer, 1802)	
Drassyllus lutetianus (L. Koch, 1866)
Drassyllus pusillus
Haplodrassus signifer
Micaria pulicaria
Scotophaeus blackwalli 
Zelotes apricorum (L. Koch, 1876)
Zelotes electus (C.L.Koch, 1839)
Zelotes latreillei (Simon, 1878)

Family Hahniidae (dwarf sheet spiders)

Antistea elegans
Hahnia helveola Simon, 1875
Hahnia montana (Blackwall, 1841)
Hahnia nava
Hahnia pusilla

Family Linyphiidae (sheet weavers)

Agyneta cauta
Agyneta decora (O.P.-Cambridge, 1871)
Agyneta conigera  
Agyneta olivacea  
Agyneta ramosa  
Agyneta subtilis  
Allomengea scopigera (Grube, 1859)
Allomengea vidua (L.Koch, 1879)
Aphileta misera (O.P.-Cambridge, 1882)
Araeoncus crassiceps(Westring, 1861)
Araeoncus humilis
Asthenargus paganus (Simon, 1884)
Baryphyma gowerense (Locket, 1965) 
Baryphyma trifrons (O.P.-Cambridge, 1863)
Bathyphantes approximatus (O.P.-Cambridge, 1871)
Bathyphantes gracilis
Bathyphantes nigrinus (Westring, 1851)	
Bathyphantes parvulus   (Westring, 1851)
Bathyphantes setiger F.O.P.-Cambridge, 1894
Bolyphantes alticeps  (Sundevall, 1833)	
Bolyphantes luteolus (Blackwall, 1833)	
Carorita limnaea (Crosby & Bishop, 1927)	
Carorita paludosa Duffey, 1971
Centromerita bicolor (Blackwall, 1833)
Centromerita concinna (Thorell, 1875)
Centromerus arcanus (O.P.-Cambridge, 1873)
Centromerus dilutus (O.P.-Cambridge, 1875)
Centromerus levitarsis (Simon, 1884)
Centromerus prudens (O.P.-Cambridge, 1873)
Ceratinella brevipes (Westring, 1851)
Ceratinella brevis (Wider, 1834)
Ceratinella scabrosa   (O.P.-Cambridge, 1871)
Centromerus persimilis  (O.P.-Cambridge, 1912)
Centromerus sylvaticus  (Blackwall, 1841)	
Cnephalocotes obscurus (Blackwall, 1834)
Collinsia inerrans (O.P.-Cambridge, 1885)
Dicymbium brevisetosum Locket, 1962
Dicymbium nigrum (Blackwall, 1834)	
Dicymbium tibiale (Blackwall, 1836)
Diplocentria bidentata (Emerton, 1882)
Diplocephalus cristatus (Blackwall, 1833)
Diplocephalus latifrons (O.P.-Cambridge, 1863)
Diplocephalus permixtus   (O.P.-Cambridge, 1871)
Diplocephalus picinus   (Blackwall, 1841)
Diplostyla concolor (Wider, 1834)
Dismodicus bifrons (Blackwall, 1841)
Donacochara speciosa (Thorell, 1875)
Invisible spider (Drapetisca socialis(Sundevall, 1833))
Drepanotylus uncatus (O.P.-Cambridge, 1873)
Entelecara errata O.P.-Cambridge, 1913	
Entelecara erythropus (Westring, 1851)	
Entelecara media Kulczynski, 1887	
Entelecara omissa (O.P.-Cambridge, 1902)	
Erigone arctica (White, 1852)
Erigone atra
Erigone dentipalpis   (Wider, 1834)
Erigone longipalpis
Erigone capra Simon, 1884
Erigone promiscua   (O.P.-Cambridge, 1872)	
Erigone welchi Jackson, 1911
Erigonella hiemalis  (Blackwall, 1841)
Erigonella ignobilis (O.P.-Cambridge, 1871)
Evansia merens O.P.-Cambridge, 1900
Floronia bucculenta
Glyphesis cottonae (La Touche, 1945)
Gnathonarium dentatum   (Wider, 1834)
Gonatium rubellum (Blackwall, 1841)	
Gonatium rubens
Gongylidiellum latebricola (O.P.-Cambridge, 1871)
Gongylidiellum murcidum Simon, 1884
Gongylidiellum vivum (O.P.-Cambridge, 1875)
Gongylidium rufipes (Linnaeus, 1758)
Halorates reprobus (O.P.-Cambridge, 1879)
Helophora insignis (Blackwall, 1841)	
Hilaira excisa (O.P.-Cambridge, 1871)	
Hilaira frigida (Thorell, 1872)	
Hilaira pervicax Hull, 1908
Hylyphantes graminicola
Hypselistes jacksoni (O.P.-Cambridge, 1902)	
Hypomma bituberculatum (Wider, 1834)
Hypomma cornutum (Blackwall, 1833)
Hypomma fulvum Büsenberg, 1902
Jacksonella falconeri (Jackson, 1908)
Kaestneria dorsalis (Wider, 1834)
Kaestneria pullata (O.P.-Cambridge, 1863)
Labulla thoracica (Wider, 1834)
Lepthyphantes alacris  (Blackwall, 1853) = Tenuiphantes
Lepthyphantes angulatus (O.P.-Cambridge, 1881) = Oryphantes
Lepthyphantes cristatus (Menge, 1866) = Tenuiphantes	
Lepthyphantes ericaeus   (Blackwall, 1853)
Lepthyphantes flavipes   (Blackwall, 1854)
Lepthyphantes insignis  O.P.-Cambridge, 1913 = Tenuiphantes
Lepthyphantes mengei   Kulczynski, 1887
Lepthyphantes minutus  
Lepthyphantes nebulosus (Sundevall, 1830) = Tenuiphantes
Lepthyphantes obscurus   (Blackwall, 1841) = Centromerus
Lepthyphantes pallidus (O.P.-Cambridge, 1871) = Tenuiphantes
Lepthyphantes tenebricola   (Wider, 1834) = Tenuiphantes
Lepthyphantes tenuis  
Lepthyphantes whymperi F.O.P.-Cambridge, 1894 = Tenuiphantes	
Lepthyphantes zimmermanni   Bertkau, 1890 = Tenuiphantes
Leptorhoptrum robustum  (Westring, 1851)
Leptothrix hardyi  (Blackwall, 1850)
Lessertia dentichelis  (Simon, 1884)
Linyphia hortensis 
Linyphia triangularis
Lophomma punctatum (Blackwall, 1841)
Macrargus rufus (Wider, 1834)
Maro minutus O.P.-Cambridge, 1906
Maso sundevalli (Westring, 1851)
Mecopisthes peusi Wunderlich, 1972
Meioneta beata (O.P.-Cambridge, 1906)
Meioneta gulosa (C.L. Koch, 1869)	
Meioneta innotabilis (O.P.-Cambridge, 1863)
Meioneta mollis 
Meioneta mossica Schikora, 1993
Meioneta rurestris
Meioneta saxatilis sensu stricto (Blackwall, 1844)
Metopobactrus prominulus (O.P.-Cambridge, 1872)
Micrargus herbigradus sensu stricto  (Blackwall, 1854)
Micrargus subaequalis (Westring, 1851)
Microctenonyx subitaneus  (O.P.-Cambridge, 1875)
Microlinyphia impigra (O.P.-Cambridge, 1871)
Microlinyphia pusilla
Microneta viaria
Minicia marginella (Wider, 1834)
Minyriolus pusillus (Wider, 1834)
Mioxena blanda (Simon, 1884)
Moebelia penicillata (Westring, 1851)
Monocephalus castaneipes (Simon, 1884)
Monocephalus fuscipes (Blackwall, 1836)
Neriene clathrata (Sundevall, 1830)
Neriene montana
Neriene peltata
Oedothorax agrestis (Blackwall, 1853)
Oedothorax apicatus (Blackwall, 1850)
Oedothorax fuscus (Blackwall, 1834)
Oedothorax gibbosus
Oedothorax retusus (Westring, 1851)
Ostearius melanopygius (O.P.-Cambridge, 1879)
Oreonetides vaginatus  (Thorell, 1872)
Pelecopsis mengei  (Simon, 1884)
Pelecopsis nemoralis (Blackwall, 1841)
Pelecopsis parallela (Wider, 1834
Peponocranium ludicrum (O.P.-Cambridge, 1861)
Pocadicnemis juncea Locket & Millidge, 1953
Pocadicnemis pumila sensu stricto (Blackwall, 1841)
Poeciloneta variegata (Blackwall, 1841)
Porrhomma campbelli F.O.P.-Cambridge, 1894 	
Porrhomma convexum  (Westring, 1851)	
Porrhomma egeria Simon, 1884
Porrhomma errans (Blackwall, 1841) 	
Porrhomma montanum Jackson, 1913 
Porrhomma oblitum  (O.P.-Cambridge, 1871)
Porrhomma pallidum Jackson, 1913 	
Porrhomma pygmaeum
Porrhomma rosenhaueri (L. Koch, 1872)
Praestigia duffeyi  (Millidge, 1954)
Rhaebothorax morulus (O.P.-Cambridge, 1873)	
Saaristoa abnormis (Blackwall, 1841)
Saaristoa firma (O.P.-Cambridge, 1905)
Saloca diceros  (O.P.-Cambridge, 1871)
Satilatlas britteni (Jackson, 1913)
Savignia frontata
Semljicola fausta  (O.P.-Cambridge, 1900) = Eboria
Silometopus ambiguus (O.P.-Cambridge, 1905)
Silometopus elegans (O.P.-Cambridge, 1872)
Silometopus incurvatus (O.P.-Cambridge, 1873)
Silometopus reussi  (Thorell, 1871)
Sintula corniger (Blackwall, 1856)
Stemonyphantes lineatus  (Linnaeus, 1758)
Styloctetor stativus (Simon, 1881)
Tallusia experta (O.P.-Cambridge, 1871)
Tapinocyba insecta (L. Koch, 1869)	
Tapinocyba pallens (O.P.-Cambridge, 1872)
Tapinocyba praecox (O.P.-Cambridge, 1873)
Tapinopa longidens
Taranucnus setosus (O.P.-Cambridge, 1863)
Thyreosthenius parasiticus  (Westring, 1851)	
Tiso vagans (Blackwall, 1834)
Tmeticus affinis (Blackwall, 1855)
Trichoncus saxicola (O.P.-Cambridge, 1861)	
Trichopterna thorelli (Westring, 1861)
Troxochrus cirrifrons (O.P.-Cambridge, 1871)	
Troxochrus scabriculus (Westring, 1851)
Typhochrestus digitatus (O.P.-Cambridge, 1872)
Walckenaeria acuminata 
Walckenaeria alticeps (Denis, 1952)
Walckenaeria antica
Walckenaeria atrotibialis
Walckenaeria capito (Westring, 1861)	
Walckenaeria clavicornis  (Emerton, 1882)	
Walckenaeria corniculans (O.P.-Cambridge, 1875)
Walckenaeria cucullata (C.L. Koch, 1836)
Walckenaeria cuspidata Blackwall, 1833
Walckenaeria dysderoides (Wider, 1834)
Walckenaeria kochi (O.P.-Cambridge, 1872)
Walckenaeria monoceros (Wider, 1834)	
Walckenaeria nodosa
Walckenaeria nudipalpis
Walckenaeria unicornis O.P.-Cambridge, 1861
Walckenaeria vigilax

Family Liocranidae (Liocranid sac spiders)
Agraecina striata (Kulczynski, 1882)	
Agroeca proxima (O.P.-Cambridge, 1871)
Liocranum rupicola  
Phrurolithus festivus (C.L. Koch, 1835)	
Scotina gracilipes (Blackwall, 1859)
Scotina celans (Blackwall, 1841)

Family Lycosidae (wolf spiders)Alopecosa cuneata (Clerck, 1757) 	Alopecosa pulverulentaArctosa cinerea (Fabricius, 1777)Arctosa leopardus (Sundevall, 1833)Arctosa perita   (Latreille, 1799)Pardosa agrestis  (Westring, 1861)Pardosa agricolaSpotted wolf spider (Pardosa amentata)Pardosa lugubrisPardosa monticolaPardosa nigricepsPardosa palustrisPardosa prativaga (L.Koch, 1870)Pardosa purbeckensis  O.P.-Cambridge, 1895	Pardosa pullata (Clerck, 1757)Pardosa saltans Töpfer-Hofmann, 2000Pirata hygrophilus Thorell, 1872Pirata latitans (Blackwall, 1841)Pirata piraticusPirata piscatorius (Clerck, 1757)Pirata tenuitarsis Simon, 1876Pirata uliginosus (Thorell, 1856)Trochosa ruricola Trochosa spinipalpisTrochosa terricolaFamily Mimetidae (pirate spiders)Ero cambridgeiEro furcataFamily MiturgidaeZora spinimanaFamily Nesticidae (scaffold web spiders)Nesticus cellulanusFamily Oonopidae (goblin spiders)Oonops domesticusOonops pulcherFamily Philodromidae (running crab spiders)Philodromus aureolusPhilodromus cespitumPhilodromus dispar Walckenaer, 1826	Philodromus emarginatus (Schrank, 1803)	Thanatus striatus Tibellus maritimus (Menge, 1875)Tibellus oblongusFamily Pholcidae (cellar spiders)

Skull spider (Pholcus phalangioides)

Family Pisauridae (nursery web spiders)

Raft spider (Dolomedes fimbriatus)Pisaura mirabilisFamily Salticidae (jumping spiders)Calositticus caricis (syn. Sitticus caricis)Euophrys frontalisEvarcha falcata Heliophanus cupreus Heliophanus flavipes (Hahn, 1832)Marpissa nivoyi (Lucas, 1846)Neon reticulatusNeon robustus Lohmander, 1945	Pseudeuophrys erratica  	Pseudeuophrys lanigera  Salticus scenicusSalticus cingulatus (Panzer, 1797)Sitticus floricola 	Sitticus pubescens (Fabricius, 1775)Talavera aequipesTalavera petrensis C.L. Koch, 1837

Family Segestriidae (tube-dwelling spiders)

Snake-back spider (Segestria senoculata)

Family ScytodidaeScytodes thoracica Latreille, 1804

Family SparassidaeMicrommata roseum (Clerck, 1757)

Family Tetragnathidae (long-jawed orb weavers)

European cave spider (Meta menardi)Metellina mengeiMetellina merianaeMetellina segmentataPachygnatha clerckiPachygnatha degeeriPachygnatha listeri  Sundevall, 1830Tetragnatha extensa Tetragnatha montana Simon, 1874Tetragnatha nigrita Lendl, 1886Tetragnatha obtusa  C.L. Koch, 1837	Tetragnatha pinicola L. Koch, 1870 Tetragnatha striata L. Koch, 1862

Family Theridiidae (tangle-web spiders)Achaearanea lunata (Clerck, 1757)= ParasteatodaAchaearanea tepidariorum = ParasteatodaAnelosimus vittatus (C.L.Koch, 1836)Asagena phalerata  (Panzer, 1801)Crustulina sticta Cryptachaea riparia Dipoena melanogaster Dipoena tristis (Hahn, 1833)Enoplognatha ovataEnoplognatha latimana Hippa & Oksala 1982Enoplognatha thoracicaEpisinus angulatusEpisinus truncatus Euryopis flavomaculataNeottiura bimaculata Paidiscura pallens (Blackwall, 1834)Pholcomma gibbum (Westring, 1851)Platnickina tinctaRobertus arundineti (O.P.-Cambridge, 1871)	Robertus lividus (Blackwall, 1836)	Robertus neglectusRugathodes bellicosus   Rugathodes instabilis (O.P.-Cambridge, 1871)Simitidion simile (C.L.Koch, 1836)
Rabbit-hutch spider (Steatoda bipunctata; also called "false widow")Steatoda grossa 	Steatoda nobilis Steatoda paykulliana ("false widow")Theonoe minutissima (O.P.-Cambridge, 1879)Theridion blackwalli  O.P.-Cambridge, 1871	Theridion impressum L.Koch, 1881 = PhyllonetaTheridion melanurum Hahn, 1831	Theridion mystaceum L.Koch, 1870Theridion sisyphium (Clerck, 1757) = PhyllonetaTheridion variansFamily Theridiosomatidae (ray spiders)Theridiosoma gemmosumFamily Thomisidae (crab spiders)Diaea dorsataGoldenrod crab spider (Misumena vatia)Ozyptila atomariaOzyptila brevipes (Hahn, 1826)Ozyptila sanctuaria  (O.P.-Cambridge, 1871)Ozyptila truxOzyptila praticola (C.L. Koch, 1837)	Xysticus audaxXysticus cristatusXysticus erraticus (Blackwall, 1834)  Xysticus lanio 	Xysticus luctuosus (Blackwall, 1836)	Xysticus sabulosus (Hahn, 1832)Xysticus ulmiFamily Uloboridae (hackled orb weavers) Hyptiotes paradoxusSee also
Encyclopedia of Life online has many images via search
Dictynoidea Placements

References

Helsdingen, P.J. van, 1996 A county distribution of Irish spiders, incorporating a revised catalogue of the species Irish Naturalists' Journal Special Issue
Invertebrate Ireland

Further information
Fauna Europaea

Identification
Key works are:-
Jones, Dick,  1983 The Country Life Guide to spiders of Britain and Northern Europe Country Life Books/Hamlyn
Jones-WaltersL.M., Keys to Families of British Spiders AIDGAP Guide, Field Studies Council No. 197, 1989.
Locket, G.H. and Millidge, A.F. British Spiders . Vol I 1951, Vol II 1953 Ray Society of London.
Locket, G.H., Millidge, A.F. and Merrett P. British Spiders Vol III 1974  Ray Society of London.
 Roberts, Michael J.,  The Spiders of Great Britain and Ireland Vols I, II, 1985, III 1987. Harley Books
 Roberts, Michael J., 1993 The Spiders of Great Britain and Ireland Compact Edition Harley Books, 1993
 Roberts, Michael J.,  1995 Collins Field Guide: Spiders of Britain and Northern Europe Harper Collins

Peter C. Barnard, 1999 Identifying British insects and arachnids: an annotated bibliography of key works''
Cambridge University Press   provides a comprehensive list of identification literature.

External links
 Wolfgang Nentwig, Theo Blick, Daniel Gloor, Ambros Hänggi & Christian Kropf Eds. Araneae of Europe Includes Descriptions, family keys, figures (pedipalps, epigyne, vulva, prosoma, eyes etc.), maps, references, image gallery. Search under species as generic placements differ
Spinnen-forum.de Comprehensive expert Wiki images, distribution (by species but under genus IE is Ireland, maps, references, descriptions in German 
British Spiders
 Biolib taxonomy, images

Ireland, arachnids
arachnid
Ireland